Spencer is a town in Rowan County, North Carolina, United States, incorporated in 1905. As of the 2010 census, the town population was 3,267.

History
The town was named for Samuel Spencer, first president of the Southern Railway, who is credited with establishment of the railroad's mechanical shops at the site in 1896. The site was approximately the midpoint of the railroad's mainline between Atlanta, GA and Washington, D.C. As the shops were being built the Southern Railway developed a town, also named Spencer, alongside the shops for worker housing. Initially, the Southern partitioned 85 acres into 500 lots. Instead of creating a traditional "company" town in which the workers rented houses Southern sold the lots to workers or businesses for $100 apiece. The deeds did contain restrictive covenants which maintained that a dwelling costing in excess of $400 and approved by a Southern appointed architect be built within a year. The Southern donated lots for religious institutions. Southern also helped establish a YMCA in the town. The community grew quickly and by 1901 had 625 residents. By the 1920s it had 4,000 residents.

The former Spencer Shops were phased out during the 1950s through 1970s and have now become the location of the North Carolina Transportation Museum.

The Alexander Long House, Southern Railway's Spencer Shops, and Spencer Historic District are listed on the National Register of Historic Places.

Geography

Demographics

2020 census

As of the 2020 United States census, there were 3,308 people, 1,153 households, and 807 families residing in the town.

2000 census
As of the census of 2000, there were 3,355 people, 1,308 households, and 844 families residing in the town. The population density was 1,264.3 people per square mile (488.8/km2). There were 1,427 housing units at an average density of 537.8 per square mile (207.9/km2). The racial makeup of the town was 70.28% White, 23.61% African American, 0.36% Native American, 0.48% Asian, 0.03% Pacific Islander, 3.61% from other races, and 1.64% from two or more races. Hispanic or Latino of any race were 6.77% of the population.

There were 1,308 households, out of which 29.1% had children under the age of 18 living with them, 46.9% were married couples living together, 13.5% had a female householder with no husband present, and 35.4% were non-families. 29.9% of all households were made up of individuals, and 14.1% had someone living alone who was 65 years of age or older. The average household size was 2.46 and the average family size was 3.04.

In the town, the population was spread out, with 23.5% under the age of 18, 8.3% from 18 to 24, 29.4% from 25 to 44, 20.2% from 45 to 64, and 18.5% who were 65 years of age or older. The median age was 38 years. For every 100 females, there were 94.2 males. For every 100 females age 18 and over, there were 91.0 males.

The median income for a household in the town was $36,687, and the median income for a family was $43,702. Males had a median income of $28,860 versus $25,766 for females. The per capita income for the town was $16,354. About 7.7% of families and 9.5% of the population were below the poverty line, including 14.0% of those under age 18 and 8.7% of those age 65 or over.

Places of Education
 North Rowan High School
 North Rowan Middle School
 North Rowan Elementary School

Trivia
Spencer is mentioned in the song "The Wreck of Old 97" as the ultimate endpoint of a train trip which is never attained. The journey began in Monroe, Virginia.

Notable person
Gil Robinson (19101985), NFL player

Hobby Shop 
Across the street from the North Carolina Transportation Museum, is the Little Choo Choo Shop It is the only model railroad shop in Spencer.

References

Works cited

External links
 Official website of Spencer, NC

Towns in Rowan County, North Carolina
Towns in North Carolina
Southern Railway (U.S.)
Populated places established in 1905
1905 establishments in North Carolina
Railway towns in North Carolina